Talehunt is a community that allows people to write, read, and post very short stories. It is available as a mobile app (the TaleHunt App) on both Android and iPhone mobile platforms. In Talehunt, any user can create an account and post stories, fan fiction, and poems, which are under 250 characters in length. This allows anyone to write very short "tales" (also known as Stories) and build a fanbase of followers, giving people the chance to have their creative works available to a wider audience. This will also help new and upcoming writers to get an audience for their creative writing. Anyone who likes to read microstories can follow good writers in Talehunt to view all their upcoming stories. Tales in Talehunt may include that of undiscovered writers, published writers, new writers, and aspiring writers. Around 55% of Talehunt users are from the United States, and the rest are from various parts of the world, including Europe and Asia.

History 
The early beta version of Talehunt was available by the end of 2015. The app was officially released January 2016.

Design 
The app has a minimalist design which is simple and is reflected in its logo: a quill and a scribble on a dark green background. The dark green theme is intended to make the TaleHunt App user-friendly and pleasant to read. Once in the app, even before logging in, the user can immediately read other users' short stories and follow the writer if the user liked the tale. Once followed, all stories will show up in the personal timeline, which is customized for each user based on the people he or she follows. Each author also has their own page, which includes their username, profile photo, follow button, number of followers, number of users followed, and a feed of all of the author's stories.

See also
 Flash fiction

References 

Ebook suppliers
Electronic paper technology
Android (operating system) software
IOS software
Ebook sources
Online publishing companies of the United States
Self-publishing companies
Short stories
2016 software